Nyholmen Lighthouse (formerly called Bodø fyr) is a coastal lighthouse in Bodø Municipality in Nordland county, Norway.  It is located on the extreme southwestern tip of a small island (connected to the mainland by a causeway) in the northern part of the harbour for the town of Bodø.

It flashes white, red, or green light (depending on direction), occulting once every six seconds.

History
That light was discontinued in 1907 when a new tower was built closer to the southwestern tip of the island. The new light was automated on the top of a concrete tower. The old lighthouse was transferred to the Society for the Preservation of Ancient Norwegian Monuments in 1987. In 2017, the old 110-year-old concrete light tower was taken down and replaced with a similar fiberglass tower.

See also

Lighthouses in Norway
List of lighthouses in Norway

References

External links
 Norsk Fyrhistorisk Forening 

Lighthouses completed in 1875
Lighthouses in Nordland
Buildings and structures in Bodø
Buildings and structures owned by the Society for the Preservation of Ancient Norwegian Monuments
1875 establishments in Norway